Volpino may refer to:

 Costa Volpino, comune in Bergamo, Lombardy, Italy
 Volpino Italiano, Italian dog breed

See also
 Volpini